Federico Bonus (born 24 January 1936) is a Filipino boxer. He competed in the men's flyweight event at the 1956 Summer Olympics.

References

1936 births
Living people
Filipino male boxers
Olympic boxers of the Philippines
Boxers at the 1956 Summer Olympics
People from Tarlac City
Boxers at the 1958 Asian Games
Asian Games competitors for the Philippines
Flyweight boxers